Izhemsky District (Iźva rajon) is an administrative district (raion), one of the twelve in the Komi Republic, Russia. It is located in the north of the republic. Its administrative center is the rural locality (a selo) of Izhma. As of the 2010 Census, the total population of the district was 18,771, with the population of Izhma accounting for 20.0% of that number.

Administrative and municipal status
Within the framework of administrative divisions, Izhemsky District is one of the twelve in the Komi Republic. The district is divided into eight selo administrative territories and two settlement administrative territories, which comprise thirty-four rural localities. As a municipal division, the district is incorporated as Izhemsky Municipal District. Its ten administrative territories are incorporated as ten rural settlements within the municipal district. The selo of Izhma serves as the administrative center of both the administrative and municipal district.

Demographics
Ethnic Komi make up the largest share of total population (86.5% in 1989). The district is the only one in the republic where birth rate is at or above replaceable levels.

References

Notes

Sources

Districts of the Komi Republic